Huayanay (Quechua for swallow) is a mountain and a massif in the Vilcabamba mountain range in the Andes of Peru, about  high. The massif is located in the Cusco Region, Anta Province, Huarocondo District and in the Urubamba Province, Ollantaytambo District. Huayanay lies east of Salcantay and Paljay.

References

Mountains of Peru
Mountains of Cusco Region